The 2022–23 UEFA Champions League knockout phase began on 14 February with the round of 16 and will end on 10 June 2023 with the final at the Atatürk Olympic Stadium in Istanbul, Turkey, to decide the champions of the 2022–23 UEFA Champions League. A total of 16 teams compete in the knockout phase.

Times are CET/CEST, as listed by UEFA (local times, if different, are in parentheses).

Qualified teams
The knockout phase involves the 16 teams which qualified as winners and runners-up of each of the eight groups in the group stage.

Format
Each tie in the knockout phase, apart from the final, is played over two legs, with each team playing one leg at home. The team that scores more goals on aggregate over the two legs advances to the next round. If the aggregate score is level, then 30 minutes of extra time is played (the away goals rule is not applied). If the score is still level at the end of extra time, the winners are decided by a penalty shoot-out. In the final, which is played as a single match, if the score is level at the end of normal time, extra time is played, followed by a penalty shoot-out if the score is still level.

The mechanism of the draws for each round is as follows:
In the draw for the round of 16, the eight group winners were seeded, and the eight group runners-up were unseeded. The seeded teams were drawn against the unseeded teams, with the seeded teams hosting the second leg. Teams from the same group or the same association could not be drawn against each other.
In the draws for the quarter-finals and semi-finals, there are no seedings, and teams from the same group or the same association can be drawn against each other. As the draws for the quarter-finals and semi-finals are held together before the quarter-finals are played, the identity of the quarter-final winners is not known at the time of the semi-final draw. A draw is also held to determine which semi-final winner is designated as the "home" team for the final (for administrative purposes as it is played at a neutral venue).

For the quarter-finals and semi-finals, teams from the same city are not scheduled to play at home on the same day or on consecutive days, due to logistics and crowd control. To avoid such scheduling conflict, if the two teams are drawn to play at home for the same leg, the order of legs of the tie involving the team with the lower domestic ranking in the qualifying season is reversed from the original draw.

Schedule
The schedule is as follows (all draws are held at the UEFA headquarters in Nyon, Switzerland).

Bracket

Round of 16

The draw for the round of 16 was held on 7 November 2022, 12:00 CET.

Summary

The first legs were played on 14, 15, 21 and 22 February, and the second legs were played on 7, 8, 14 and 15 March 2023.

|}

Matches

Manchester City won 8–1 on aggregate.

Benfica won 7–1 on aggregate.

Real Madrid won 6–2 on aggregate.

Milan won 1–0 on aggregate.

Napoli won 5–0 on aggregate.

Chelsea won 2–1 on aggregate.

Inter Milan won 1–0 on aggregate.

Bayern Munich won 3–0 on aggregate.

Quarter-finals

The draw for the quarter-finals was held on 17 March 2023, 12:00 CET.

Summary

The first legs will be played on 11 and 12 April, and the second legs will be played on 18 and 19 April 2023.

|}
Notes

Matches

Semi-finals

The draw for the semi-finals was held on 17 March 2023, 12:00 CET, after the quarter-final draw.

Summary

The first legs will be played on 9 and 10 May, and the second legs will be played on 16 and 17 May 2023.

|}

Matches

Final

The final will be played on 10 June 2023 at the Atatürk Olympic Stadium in Istanbul. A draw was held on 17 March 2023, after the quarter-final and semi-final draws, to determine the "home" team for administrative purposes.

Notes

References

External links

3
February 2023 sports events in Europe
March 2023 sports events in Europe
April 2023 sports events in Europe
May 2023 sports events in Europe